The 75th Regiment of Foot (Invalids) was an infantry regiment of the British Army from 1762 to 1768. It was originally raised as a regiment of invalids in June 1762, by John Lind, and numbered the 118th Foot; it was renumbered as the 75th the following year, and disbanded in 1768 or 1769.

See also
 118th Regiment of Foot

References

Infantry regiments of the British Army
Military units and formations established in 1762
Military units and formations disestablished in 1768